The 2009–10 Maltese First Division season started in October 2009 and ended in May 2010.
Vittoriosa Stars (2008–09 Maltese First Division Runners up) and Marsaxlokk (2008–09 Maltese Premier League 4th place) were both found guilty of corruption and demoted into the First Division.
Balzan Youths and Melita were promoted from 2008–09 Maltese Second Division.

Teams
These teams will contest the 2009–10 season:
 Balzan Youths
 Marsaxlokk
 Melita
 Mosta
 Mqabba
 Pietà Hotspurs
 San Ġwann
 St. George's
 St. Patrick
 Vittoriosa Stars

Changes from previous season
 Dingli Swallows and Vittoriosa Stars were promoted to the Premier League and were initially replaced with Ħamrun Spartans and Msida Saint-Joseph, both relegated from 2008–09 Maltese Premier League.
However, Vittoriosa Stars and Marsaxlokk (who finished 4th place on the Premier Division) were both found guilty of corruption and demoted from the Premier Division into the First Division. Msida Saint-Joseph and Hamrun Spartans were therefore reinstated in the Maltese Premier League.
 Rabat Ajax and Senglea Athletic were relegated to the 2009–10 Maltese Second Division. They were replaced with Balzan and Melita.

League table

Results

Top scorers

References

Maltese First Division seasons
Malta
2